Adolf Rubi (January 12, 1905 – April 23, 1988) was a Swiss skier. He competed at the 1928 Winter Olympics in St. Moritz, where he placed 11th in Nordic combined.

References

External links
 
  (alpine)
  (Nordic combined)

1905 births
1988 deaths
Swiss male Nordic combined skiers
Olympic Nordic combined skiers of Switzerland
Nordic combined skiers at the 1928 Winter Olympics